The Western Australian 175th Anniversary of European settlement was celebrated in 2004.

The anniversary celebrations were different in style to the 1929 centenary events, and limited in their extent compared to those of the 150th anniversary in 1979.

Funding was made available for films about the original Noongar inhabitants for the celebrations, to acknowledge the original people.

Books and compilations related to the anniversary were published in 2004.

A range of community groups contributed to the celebration throughout the state, as did The West Australian, the sole daily WA newspaper.

Icons of WA history
As part of the celebrations, a list was made of iconic events and places of Western Australian history. The list was compiled by the Western Australian Government and the National Trust of Western Australia.

The public were able to nominate their choices, however the number of nominations were not the final deciding factor. Thirteen icons were included in the project, one for each month of the anniversary and two in December.

 Swan River
 Fremantle Harbour
 Kings Park
  ANZAC Day dawn service at Albany
 Rottnest Island
 Broome pearls
 Ningaloo Reef
 Western Derby, an Australian Football League match between the West Coast Eagles and Fremantle Dockers
 Kalgoorlie gold
 Perth Royal Show
 Bungle Bungle Range
 His Majesty's Theatre
 Midland Railway Workshops

References

2004 in Western Australia
Western Australian historical anniversaries